The Indian locomotive class WAP-5 is the name of a class of "High Speed" electric locomotives produced and used by Indian Railways. The first 10 locomotives were imported from ABB in Switzerland in 1995. These locomotives are a hybrid design mixing SBB-CFF-FFS Re 460 design and German DB Class 120 mechanics and chassis.

One of the notable features of WAP-5 is regenerative braking. Braking systems include  regenerative brakes, loco disc brakes, automatic train air brakes, and a charged spring parking brake.

Locomotive sheds

Named locos 
 WAP-5 30011 Navodit (GZB)
 WAP-5 30012 Navjagran (GZB)
 WAP-5 30013 Navkirti (GZB)
 WAP-5 30015 Vijay Utkarsh (GZB)
 WAP-5 30044 Gaurav (BRC)

200 km/h Variant 
The control software was also modified accordingly. Another locomotive (no. 30164) was rolled out with aerodynamic cab profile. This is just a trial and not intended for passenger use as the tracks are not supported in major routes.

Head-On Generation (HOG)
A main feature of Some locomotives of this class is that they eliminate the need to have separate End on Generation (EOG) sets or DG (Diesel Generator) sets for supplying power to the train resulting in significant savings on maintenance and running costs. This technology, called HOG or "Head On Generation", transfers electric power from the loco's pantograph to the coaches instead of EOG where a power car equipped with diesel generator capable of generating adequate power of 3-phase 50 Hz 415 V / 750 V AC (called 'head-end power') is provided at either end of the train rake to supply power.

A WAP-5 locomotive (no. 30140) with Head-on Generation (HOG) was rolled by CLW in June 2018. In this locomotive, the hotel load converter has been accommodated in the same cubicle of traction converter. More locomotives of this type will be rolled out in future.

Power upgrade to 6000 HP
Modifications were carried out in the control software. Based on successful trials, the Indian Railways decided to proliferate the modification on all WAP-5 locomotives.

Tejas Express push-pull version
Two WAP-5 locomotives (no. 35012 and 35013) were given an asymmetric body design with an aerodynamic profile for one cab and a blunt profile for another cab at the opposite end, which is intended to be semi-permanently coupled with a train in normal operation (a similar design was previously used on the British Rail Class 91 locomotives). One locomotive will be placed on each end of the train to utilize a push-pull configuration for future Tejas Express services. These locomotives were inaugurated in October 2020.

Liveries 
 The most common livery for WAP-5 locomotives is white, black and a twin red band.
 In 2014, Amul Milk made a contract with Vadodara Shed to apply wrap advertising on 20 Vadodara-based WAP-5 locomotives.
 WAP-5 locomotives based at Electric Loco Shed, Ghaziabad have large P-5 decals on the sides.
 Another wrap advertising for Fortune Edible Oils was released by Vadodara (BRC) Electric Loco Shed with locomotive no. 30081.
One wrap advertising for Fortune Edible Oils was transferred from Vadodara (BRC) Electric Loco Shed to Howrah (HWH) Electric Loco Shed with locomotive no. 30115.
Another two wrap advertising for Fortune Biryani Special Basmati Rice were transferred from Vadodara (BRC) Electric Loco Shed to Howrah (HWH) Electric Loco Shed with locomotive no. 30106 and 30112 respectively.
 The Tejas WAP-5 with the same livery as the Tejas Express.

Gallery

Technical specifications
Specifications are as follows:

Performance 

WAP-5 (5440 HP) has the following capacity for ICF coaches in tonnes:

Average weight of an ICF coach is 55 tonnes.

Acceleration
A 24 coach (1430t) passenger rake can be accelerated to 110 km/h in 312.1 seconds (over 6 Km), to 120 km/h in 402sec (6.9km); and to 130km/h in 556 sec (14.2km) by a WAP5.

See also

Indian Railways
Locomotives of India
Rail transport in India

References

External links

India railway fan club

Electric locomotives of India
25 kV AC locomotives
Bo-Bo locomotives
Railway locomotives introduced in 1995
5 ft 6 in gauge locomotives